Graeme John Shimmin (born 24 September 1967), is a British science-fiction novelist and blogger.

Early life
Shimmin was born in Manchester, UK.  He studied Physics at Durham University and worked in IT for fifteen years before completing a Creative Writing MA at Manchester Metropolitan University.

Career
Shimmin has released one novel through Transworld Publishers - A Kill in the Morning, an alternate history/sci-fi thriller set in an 1955 alternate Britain and Europe after the death of Winston Churchill in 1941. The novel received mixed reviews from Booklist, Publishers Weekly, SFX Magazine and Interzone, and Stephen Baxter endorsed it as "A terrific debut".

The novel, which Shimmin started whilst doing an MA at Manchester Metropolitan University, was shortlisted for the Terry Pratchett First Novel Award in 2013 and won the YouWriteOn Book of the Year 2013.

In 2014, Shimmin's blog was shortlisted for the Blog North Awards, which are part of the Manchester Literature Festival, in the Arts and Culture section He has also had articles re-posted on Huffington Post, Forbes, and Slate.

Influences
Shimmin has said that his influences include Robert Harris, Alistair MacLean, and Len Deighton. Maxim Jakubowski has described Shimmin's influences as Ian Fleming, and Geoffrey Household.

Bibliography
 A Kill in the Morning (June 2014 –  [UK], Transworld)

References

External links
 Official site

 Graeme Shimmin at Transworld Publishers
 Graeme Shimmin at A.M. Heath

British alternative history writers
British male novelists
Writers from Manchester
1967 births
Living people
21st-century British novelists
British science fiction writers
Alumni of University College, Durham
Alumni of Manchester Metropolitan University
21st-century English male writers